Luis Tudanca Fernández (born 25 May 1978) is a Spanish Socialist Workers' Party (PSOE) politician who has been the party's Secretary General in Castile and León since 2014. He has been Leader of the Opposition in the Cortes of Castile and León since the 2015 elections, and was previously in the Congress of Deputies between 2008 and 2015.

Biography
Born in Burgos, Tudanca graduated from the University of Burgos in Law, and obtained a master's degree in Consumer Law, before joining the University's board in 2000. In 2008, he was third on the PSOE's list in the province of Burgos for the 2008 general election, later moving up to second and being elected; he was the list leader three years later.

In October 2014, Tudanca became Secretary General of PSOE in Castile and León, receiving endorsements from former prime minister José Luis Rodríguez Zapatero. In the May 2015 regional election, the party came second to the People's Party (PP), with Tudanca leader of the opposition to regional president Juan Vicente Herrera.

In May 2019, Tudanca's party the most-voted for in regional elections, but the PP and Citizens formed a government and installed Alfonso Fernández Mañueco as president. Tudanca accused the two parties of running the region through their national leaders in Madrid, assisted by the far-right party Vox.

In March 2021, Tudanca tabled a motion of no confidence in Fernández Mañueco's government. The motion failed, being supported only by the PSOE and two Podemos representatives, and abstained on by minor parties. In snap elections in February 2022, the party lost seven seats and 118,000 votes. He said afterwards "Believe that others will come and will achieve the change than this land deserves".

References

1978 births
Living people
People from Burgos
University of Burgos alumni
Spanish Socialist Workers' Party politicians
Members of the 9th Congress of Deputies (Spain)
Members of the 10th Congress of Deputies (Spain)
Members of the 9th Cortes of Castile and León
Members of the 10th Cortes of Castile and León
Members of the 11th Cortes of Castile and León